Andrew Barry Casson Gaze  (born 24 July 1965) is an Australian former professional basketball player and coach. He played 22 seasons in the National Basketball League (NBL) with the Melbourne Tigers from 1984 to 2005, winning the league's MVP award seven times and winning the scoring title 14 times. He also guided the Tigers to two NBL championships, in 1993 and 1997, and was named an All-NBL First Team member for a record 15 consecutive years. Gaze has been described as one of the greatest players Australia has ever produced.

Gaze led the senior Australian national team, the Boomers, to five Summer Olympic Games – including as the flag bearer at the opening ceremony of the 2000 Sydney Olympics, and he was also the Australian Team Captain. He was inducted into the Australian Basketball Hall of Fame in 2004, and the Sport Australia Hall of Fame in 2005, after being appointed a Member of the Order of Australia in 2002. In 2013, he joined his father, Lindsay, in the FIBA Hall of Fame, after being elected as a player, to become just the third Australian inductee. Two Australian basketball awards have been named in Gaze's honour: the NBL MVP award is named the Andrew Gaze Trophy, and the Australian International Player of the Year award is named the Gaze Medal.

Early life and family
Gaze was born in Melbourne, Victoria, the son of Lindsay and Margaret Gaze. He has an older sister, Janet. Gaze is also the nephew of former Australian Opals coach Tony Gaze and the cousin of Mark Gaze, who played 182 games in the NBL from 1983–1991 and represented Australia at the 1982 FIBA World Championship. He is also the second cousin of Canberra Capitals guard Kate Gaze, the daughter of Mark Gaze and former WNBL player Michelle O'Connor.

Gaze grew up at Albert Park Basketball Stadium, the home of the Victorian Basketball Association (VBA), with his father the general manager of the VBA at the time. After graduating from Albert Park College, Gaze pursued a professional basketball career and attended Victoria University in Melbourne.

Playing career

NBL and college
In 1984, Gaze joined the Melbourne Tigers of the National Basketball League as an 18-year-old. His first season with the Tigers saw him win the NBL Rookie of the Year Award after averaging an impressive 29.1 points, 6.7 rebounds, 4.1 assists and 1.6 steals in 24 games. By 1986, he made his first All-NBL First Team selection. He would go on to earn first-team honours in 15 straight seasons (1986–2000). In the 1987 NBL season, Gaze set an NBL record for points per game in a season when he averaged 44.1 points. This was despite the Tigers finishing the season in last place with a 3–23 record. During the season, Gaze had a 60-point game (against the Newcastle Falcons) and another five 50-point games.

Following the 1988 NBL season, Gaze, who was spotted by talent scouts while playing for Australia at the 1988 Olympics, moved to the United States after being recruited to play college basketball for Seton Hall University. During the 1988–89 season, Gaze played in 38 games for the Seton Hall Pirates, averaging 13.6 points, 4.5 rebounds and 2.9 assists per game. Gaze started every game in The Hall's first-ever run to the NCAA Final Four, twice leading all Pirates scorers with 19 points in their Elite Eight win over UNLV and 20 points (highlighted by 4-from-9 shooting from 3) in the National Semifinal win against Duke. He completed his season at Seton Hall with an 80–79 overtime loss to the Michigan Wolverines in the NCAA Championship Game which was played in front of 39,187 fans at the Kingdome in Seattle, where he was heavily guarded and limited to only five field goal attempts, all from three-point range. After a year in New Jersey, Gaze returned to Australia and re-joined the Tigers for the 1989 NBL season. He missed the back-end of the 1990 NBL season due to a blood clot in his right shoulder.

Not known for being an outstanding athlete, Gaze's heavy scoring in the NBL was due to exceptional shooting, including from three-point range. A crowd favourite to the Tigers faithful, Gaze was a front runner in the league's resurgence during the 1990s, as he and American import Lanard Copeland combined to form a formidable backcourt and guided the Tigers to two championships in 1993 and 1997. Playing under his father with the Tigers, Gaze assured the team were perpetual finalists.

In his later years, Gaze still managed to score at a high clip for the Tigers, averaging over 19 points per game in each of his last four NBL seasons. Following the 2004–05 NBL season, Gaze announced his retirement from the NBL. In 20 seasons with the Tigers, he played a total of 612 games and recorded 18,908 points at an average of 30.9 points per game.

Europe and NBA
In addition to playing in the NBL, Gaze spent multiple seasons overseas during the 1990s. In 1991, Gaze became the first Australian male to play professionally in Europe, with Italian 2nd League club Udine. In a six-month stint in Italy, he averaged over 30 points per game. Despite his best efforts, the team finished the league last and was relegated to the 3rd division. In March 1994, Gaze returned to the United States and signed with the NBA's Washington Bullets. In seven games for the Bullets during the 1993–94 NBA season, he averaged 3.1 points per game. In early 1995, he moved to Greece and played half a season for Greek League club Apollon Patras. He had another short stint in the NBA during the lockout-shortened 1998–99 season, this time with the San Antonio Spurs. He received very little court time for a stacked Spurs team that included guards Mario Elie, Avery Johnson, Antonio Daniels and Steve Kerr. He appeared in just 19 games for the Spurs during the regular season and was inactive for the entire playoff run, which saw the Spurs win their first NBA championship.

National team
On the international stage, Gaze forged his reputation as one of Australia's finest products, appearing at the 1984 Los Angeles Olympic Games, as a 19-year-old. He led all scorers at the 1994 FIBA World Championship with 23.9 points per game, leading the Aussies to a fifth-place finish. In 2000, he became (jointly with American Teresa Edwards) the third basketball player to compete at five Olympics, after Puerto Rican Teófilo Cruz and Brazilian Oscar Schmidt. That year, Gaze was the flag bearer at the opening ceremony of the Sydney Olympics, and he was also the Australian Team Captain. At the 1996 Atlanta Olympics, he led the Boomers to their then best Olympic performance, a fourth-placed finish, with a 5–3 record.

Gaze also competed in four FIBA World Cups with the Boomers, as he played in more than 280 matches for Australia. Gaze is the second all-time career points scorer, behind only Brazil's Oscar Schmidt, in Summer Olympic Games history, and he is third all-time in career points scored in FIBA World Cup history, after Schmidt and Argentina's Luis Scola.

Coaching career

Sydney Kings
In April 2016, Gaze was appointed head coach of the Sydney Kings in the NBL. He served as coach for three seasons before stepping down in 2019.

Melbourne Tigers
In 2016 and 2017, Gaze served as head coach of the Melbourne Tigers men's team in the SEABL.

In October 2022, Gaze was appointed head coach of the Melbourne Tigers men's team for the 2023 NBL1 South season.

Indiana Pacers
In 2017, Gaze joined the coaching staff of the Indiana Pacers for the Orlando Summer League.

Off the court
After retiring from playing professionally, Gaze became a media personality and began commentating NBL games for Network Ten and Fox Sports. He is also a presenter on Channel Seven's Guide to the Good Life and on Bounce on Fox Footy. In 2006, he appeared in season five of Dancing with the Stars.

In March 2016, Gaze became an ambassador for the non-for-profit organisation The Beehive Foundation, a charity that runs free programs to develop resilience and coping mechanisms for youth via junior sporting organisations.

Gaze and his wife Melinda have four children; Courtney, Phoebe, Annie and Mason. In 2014, he was named Australian Father of the Year by children's charity The Shepherd Centre.

Between 2005 and 2010, the Gaze shoe brand sold over 500,000 pairs.

Records, honours and awards
Record for most Summer Olympic Games for an Australian basketball player (5 – 1984, 1988, 1992, 1996 and 2000)
Flag bearer at the opening ceremony of the 2000 Sydney Olympics and the Australian Team Captain
Inducted into the Australian Basketball Hall of Fame (2004), Sport Australia Hall of Fame (2005), and FIBA Hall of Fame (2013)
Elevated to legend status in the Australian Basketball Hall of Fame in 2022
Was made a Member of the Order of Australia in 2002
NBL all-time:
1st in Points – 18,908
1st in Assists – 3,531
1st in Field Goals Made – 6,484
1st in 3-Pointers Made – 1,826
1st in Free Throws Made – 4,114
2nd in Games Played – 612
3rd in Steals – 1,075
NBL's highest single-season points per game average (44.1) (1987)
8× NBL three-point field goal leader (1988, 1989, 1992, 1993, 1996–1999)
10× NBL free-throw percentage leader (1990, 1992, 1994–1996, 1999, 2001–2004)
NBA champion (1999)
2× NBL champion (1993, 1997)
7× NBL MVP (1991, 1992, 1994–1998)
15× All-NBL First Team (1986–2000)
All-NBL Second Team (2001)
14× NBL scoring champion (1986, 1988, 1989, 1991–2001)
NBL assist champion (1989)
11× NBL All-Star (1988–1997, 2004)
2× NBL All-Star Game MVP (1989, 1992)
NBL Rookie of the Year (1984)
8× NBL Most Efficient Player (1990–1997)
6× Gaze Medalist (1990, 1994–1996, 1998, 2000)
FIBA's 50 Greatest Players (1991)
Australian Basketball Hall of Fame (2004)
Sport Australia Hall of Fame (2005)
Was named a member of the NBL's 20th, 25th and 40th anniversary teams

Honour roll

Career statistics

NBL

{|class="wikitable" width="84%"
|- align="center" style="background:#ff2000;color:white;"
| Year||Team|| G ||GS|| MIN || PTS|| AVG.||FG || FGA || PCT.|| 3–FG|| 3–FGA|| PCT. || FT || FTA|| PCT. || REB ||AST|| STL|| BLK||TO ||PF
|- align="center" bgcolor=""
|- align="center" bgcolor=""
|-
| style="text-align:left;"| 1984
| style="text-align:left;"| Melbourne Tigers
|| 24 || 24 ||0.00||699||29.1|| 11.7||18.6||.576||0.5||1.6||.325|| 5.1||7.2||.724||6.7||4.1||1.6|| 0.3 ||2.3||3.8 
|-
| style="text-align:left;"| 1985
| style="text-align:left;"| Melbourne Tigers
|| 18 || 18 || 0.00 || 547 || 30.4 || 11.8 || 23.2 || .51 || 2.0 || 6.1 || .336|| 4.6 || 6.4 || .709 || 6.7 || 4.4 || 2.1 || 0.3 || 4.9 || 3.9
|-
|-
| style="text-align:left;"| 1986
| style="text-align:left;"| Melbourne Tigers
|| 25 || 25 || 0.00 || 922 || 36.9 || 13.8 || 26.1 || .529 || 2.1 || 5.5 || .381 || 7.08 || 8.8 || .805 || 7.3 || 4.4 || 2.1 || 0.2 || 4.0 || 3.4
|-
|-
| style="text-align:left;"| 1987
| style="text-align:left;"| Melbourne Tigers
|| 20 || 20 || 47.7 || 882 || 44.1 || 15.9 || 30.2 || .526 || 3.4 || 8.6 || .393 || 8.9 || 11 || .809 || 8.2 || 5.8 || 2.5 || 0.1 || 4.8 || 3.3
|-
| style="text-align:left;"| 1988
| style="text-align:left;"| Melbourne Tigers
|| 24 || 24 || 46.8 || 886 || 36.9 || 13.5 || 26.3|| .523 || 4.1 || 9.5 || .432 || 5.7 || 7.2 || .792 || 6.3 || 4.7 || 2.3 || 0.6 || 3.7 || 3.0
|-
| style="text-align:left;"| 1989
| style="text-align:left;"| Melbourne Tigers
|| 27 || 27 || 45.7 || 931 || 34.5 || 12.4 || 23 || .539 || 3.8 || 9.7 || .401 || 5.7 || 6.9 || .834 || 5.3 || 7.2 || 2.4 || 0.8 || 4.2|| 3.9
|-
| style="text-align:left;"| 1990
| style="text-align:left;"| Melbourne Tigers
|| 22 || 22 || 0.00 || 828 || 37.6 || 13.6 || 23.7 || .575 || 3.5 || 9.0 || .385 || 6.8 || 7.8 || .873 || 4.8 || 6.9 || 2.6 || 0.3 || 4.0|| 3.2
|-
| style="text-align:left;"| 1991
| style="text-align:left;"| Melbourne Tigers
|| 28 || 28 || 46.4 || 1086 || 38.8 || 13.5 || 24.3 || .554 || 3.1 || 9.3 || .333 || 8.6 || 9.9 || .871 || 4.4 || 6.0 || 2.7 || 0.4 || 4.5 || 3.8 
|-
| style="text-align:left;"| 1992
| style="text-align:left;"| Melbourne Tigers
|| 32 || 32 || 46.1 || 1082 || 33.8 || 11.2 || 22.1 || .508 || 2.9 || 8.8 || .331 || 8.3 || 9.6 || .865 || 4.6 || 6.3 || 2.7 || 0.3 || 5.0 || 3.4 
|-
| style="text-align:left;"| 1993 †
| style="text-align:left;"| Melbourne Tigers
|| 33 || 33 || 45.8 || 1056 || 32.0 || 10.6 || 20.8 || .511 || 3.1 || 8.0|| .391 || 7.5 || 8.7 || .858 || 4.6 || 6.3 || 2.7 || 0.3 || 5.0 || 3.4 
|-
| style="text-align:left;"| 1994
| style="text-align:left;"| Melbourne Tigers
|| 30 || 30 || 47 || 1001 || 33.4 || 10.9 || 21.2 || .515 || 2.5 || 7.1 || .321 || 9.2 || 10.1 || .905 || 4.8 || 7.2 || 2.4 || 0.2 || 5.7 || 3.3
|-
| style="text-align:left;"| 1995
| style="text-align:left;"| Melbourne Tigers
|| 29 || 29 || 46.8 || 983 || 33.9 || 11.3 || 22 || .513 || 3.1 || 8.5 || .361 || 8.1 || 9.1 || .898 || 4.2 || 8.0 || 2.3 || 0.5 || 4.5 || 3.3 
|-
| style="text-align:left;"| 1996
| style="text-align:left;"| Melbourne Tigers
|| 35 || 35 || 46.6 || 1089 || 31.1 || 10 || 19.8 || .506 || 3.1 || 8.7 || .358 || 7.9 || 8.7 || .905 || 5.3 || 8.1 || 1.7 || 0.5 || 4.7 || 3.1 
|-
| style="text-align:left;"| 1997 †
| style="text-align:left;"| Melbourne Tigers
|| 35 || 35 || 47.9 || 1080 || 30.9 || 10.4 || 20.1 || .520 || 4.0 || 10.4 || .390 || 5.8 || 6.7 || .857 || 4.6 || 6.7 || 1.4 || 0.4 || 4.5 || 3.5 
|-
| style="text-align:left;"| 1998
| style="text-align:left;"| Melbourne Tigers
|| 32 || 32 || 47.5 || 1007 || 31.5 || 10.6 || 21.3 || .497 || 3.9 || 10.5 || .375 || 6.2 || 7.0 || .893 || 4.6 || 6.5 || 1.4 || 0.2 || 3.7 || 3.0 
|-
| style="text-align:left;"| 1998–99
| style="text-align:left;"| Melbourne Tigers
|| 17 || 17 || 47.6 || 569 || 30.9 || 11.4 || 21.3 || .534 || 4.4 || 11.1 || .421 || 5.9 || 6.6 || .893 || 4.6 || 5.5 || 2.2 || 0.1 || 3.6 || 2.4 
|-
| style="text-align:left;"| 1999–2000
| style="text-align:left;"| Melbourne Tigers
|| 31 || 31 || 47.2 || 904 || 30.9 || 9.5 || 19.6 || .488 || 3.0 || 9.0 || .344|| 6.9 || 7.8 || .881 || 5.7 || 6.5 || 1.5 || 0.2 || 3.7 || 3.0 
|-
| style="text-align:left;"| 2000–01
| style="text-align:left;"| Melbourne Tigers
|| 28 || 28 || 46.4 || 816 || 29.1 || 9.4 || 18.5 || .508 || 3.0 || 8.6 || .357 || 7.2 || 7.8 || .914 || 6.3 || 5.8 || 0.9 || 0.2 || 4.8 || 3.9
|-
| style="text-align:left;"| 2001–02
| style="text-align:left;"| Melbourne Tigers
|| 24 || 24 || 36.6 || 458 || 19.1 || 6 || 13.1 || .457 || 1.6 || 6.2 || .265 || 5.4 || 6.1 || .884 || 4.0 || 5.0 || 0.7 || 0.5 || 3.3 || 2.9
|-
| style="text-align:left;"| 2002–03
| style="text-align:left;"| Melbourne Tigers
|| 29 || 29 || 42.1 || 640 || 22.1 || 6.6 || 14.2 || .469 || 2.5 || 7.9 || .346 || 6.0 || 6.7 || .893 || 4.0 || 4.7 || 1.1|| 0.5 || 4.2 || 3.6
|-
| style="text-align:left;"| 2003–04
| style="text-align:left;"| Melbourne Tigers
|| 35 || 35 || 38.8 || 746 || 21.3 || 7 || 13.6 || .514 || 2.5 || 6.9 || .364 || 4.7 || 5.2 || .902 || 3.3 || 3.5 || 0.9 || 0.4 || 2.8 || 2.8
|-
| style="text-align:left;"| 2004–05
| style="text-align:left;"| Melbourne Tigers
|| 34 || 34 || 35.1 || 696 || 22.1 || 6.6 || 13.6 || .484 || 2.3 || 6.8 || .348 || 4.8 || 5.8|| .829 || 3.1 || 3.1 || 0.8 || 0.3 || 2.4 || 2.4
|- class="sortbottom"
| style="text-align:center;" colspan="2"| Career
| 612 || 612 || 38.7 || 18.908 || 30.9 || 10.5 || 20.4 || 51.8 || 3.0 || 8.1 || .365 || 6.7 || 7.8 || .860 || 5.1 || 5.8 || 1.8 || 0.4 || 4.1 || 3.3

NBA

|-
| style="text-align:left;"| 
| style="text-align:left;"| Washington
| 7 || 0 || 10.0 || .471 || .500 || 1.000 || 1.0 || .7 || .3 || .1 || 3.1
|-
| style="text-align:left;background:#afe6ba;"| 
| style="text-align:left;"| San Antonio
| 19 || 0 || 3.1 || .320 || .313 || .000 || .3 || '.3 || .1 || .1 || 1.1
|-
| style="text-align:center;" colspan="2"| Career
| 26 || 0 || 4.9 || .381 || .375 || 1.000 || .5 || .4 || .2 || .1 || 1.7

College
{|class="wikitable" width="84%"
|- align="center" style="background:#003E7E;color:white;"
| Year||Team|| G ||GS|| MIN || PTS|| AVG.||FG || FGA || PCT.|| 3–FG|| 3–FGA|| PCT. || FT || FTA|| PCT. || REB ||AST|| STL|| BLK||TO ||PF
|- align="center" bgcolor=""
|- align="center" bgcolor=""
| 1988–89 || Seton Hall || 38 || 37 || 32.6 || 516 || 13.6 || 5.5 || 8.8 || .509 || 2.5 || 5.8 || .425 || 2.2 || 3.0 || .726 || 4.5 || 2.8 || 2.9 || 2.1 || 0.4 || 1.3
|- align="center" bgcolor=""

See also 
 List of athletes with the most appearances at Olympic Games

Bibliography

Contributor

References

External links
Andrew Gaze at archive.fiba.com
Andrew Gaze at basketball.net.au
Andrew Gaze at foxsportspulse.com
Andrew Gaze at interbasket.net
Andrew Gaze at legabasket.it 
Andrew Gaze at nbl.com.au

1965 births
Living people
1986 FIBA World Championship players
1990 FIBA World Championship players
1994 FIBA World Championship players
1998 FIBA World Championship players
Apollon Patras B.C. players
Australian expatriate basketball people in Greece
Australian expatriate basketball people in Italy
Australian expatriate basketball people in the United States
Australian men's basketball players
1982 FIBA World Championship players
Australian republicans
Basketball announcers
Basketball players at the 1984 Summer Olympics
Basketball players at the 1988 Summer Olympics
Basketball players at the 1992 Summer Olympics
Basketball players at the 1996 Summer Olympics
Basketball players at the 2000 Summer Olympics
Basketball players from Melbourne
FIBA Hall of Fame inductees
Melbourne Tigers players
Members of the Order of Australia
National Basketball Association players from Australia
Olympic basketball players of Australia
Pallalcesto Amatori Udine players
Point guards
San Antonio Spurs players
Seton Hall Pirates men's basketball players
Shooting guards
Sport Australia Hall of Fame inductees
Sydney Kings coaches
Undrafted National Basketball Association players
Washington Bullets players
People from Albert Park, Victoria
Sportsmen from Victoria (Australia)
Victoria University, Melbourne alumni